Nina Ortlieb (born 2 April 1996) is an Austrian World Cup alpine ski racer, and specializes in the speed events of downhill and super-G. She is the daughter of Patrick Ortlieb, the Olympic gold medalist in downhill in 1992 and world champion in 1996.

Career
Ortlieb attended the Stams ski high school and won a total of four Austrian student championship titles between 2009 and 2011. In December 2011, after reaching the age limit, she competed in her first FIS races and took part in a Alpine Skiing Europa Cup race for the first time on 16 January 2013 at the downhill in St. Anton, where she was immediately classified among the top ten as seventh. At the end of February 2013 Ortlieb was part of the Austrian squad for the Junior World Championships in Quebec. After two retirements in slalom and Super-G, she finished twelfth in the downhill. At the end of the season she became Austrian Junior Champion in the downhill in April 2013.

For the 2013/14 season she was accepted into the C squad of the Austrian Ski Federation and has been competing regularly in the European Cup since this winter. On 18 December 2013, she achieved the first two podium finishes in this race series when she finished third in both downhill and Super-G in St. Moritz. On 12 January 2014 she made her World Cup debut in the Super Combination in Altenmarkt-Zauchensee, but retired in Super-G. On 6 February 2014, she tore her cruciate ligament during training and had to end the season early.

The following winter she was able to continue her old level of performance, achieved two more podium places in the European Cup and won the gold medal in giant slalom at the Junior World Championships in Hafjell on 7 March 2015. At the Junior World Championships in Sochi/Rosa Chutor in 2016 she won the title in Super-G. As junior world champion she was eligible to start at the world cup final in St. Moritz, where she scored her first world cup points as eleventh-placed in the super-G. In the 2016/17 World Cup season, on the other hand, she was never able to gain points, which is why she was increasingly used in the European Cup. In winter 2017/18 she won the overall European Cup ranking.

At the beginning of the 2019/20 season, Ortlieb finished fourth behind the Czech surprise winner Ester Ledecká at the World Cup downhill in Lake Louise in December 2019. After three further placings among the top ten over the course of the winter, she achieved her first World Cup podium finish on 22 February with third place in the downhill of Crans-Montana. A week later she won her first World Cup race in the Super-G in La Thuile.

World Cup results

Season standings

Race podiums
 2 wins (2 SG)
 4 podiums (2 DH, 2 SG), 12 top tens (8 DH, 4 SG)

World Championship results

Europa Cup results
Ortlieb has won an overall Europa Cup.

FIS Alpine Ski Europa Cup
Overall: 2018

References

External links

1996 births
Living people
Austrian female alpine skiers
Sportspeople from Innsbruck
20th-century Austrian women
21st-century Austrian women